Qalui Zendan (also Romanized as Qālūī Zendān; also known as Qālū Zendān) is a village in Kani Bazar Rural District, Khalifan District, Mahabad County, West Azerbaijan Province, Iran. At the 2006 census, its population was 438, in 63 families.

References 

Populated places in Mahabad County